Jean-Louis Loday (12 January 1946 – 6 June 2012) was a French mathematician who worked on cyclic homology and who introduced Leibniz algebras (sometimes called Loday algebras) and Zinbiel algebras.
He occasionally used the pseudonym Guillaume William Zinbiel, formed by reversing the last name of Gottfried Wilhelm Leibniz.

Education and career
Loday studied at Lycée Louis-le-Grand and at École Normale Supérieure in Paris.  He completed his Ph.D. at the University of Strasbourg in 1975 under the supervision of Max Karoubi, with a dissertation titled K-Théorie algébrique et représentations de groupes. He went on to become a senior scientist at CNRS and a member of the Institute for Advanced Mathematical Research (IRMA) at the University of Strasbourg.

Publications

See also
Associahedron
Blakers–Massey theorem
Loday functor

References

Obituary
Home page

External links
Loday's biography of Guillaume William Zinbiel 

1946 births
2012 deaths
20th-century French mathematicians
21st-century French mathematicians
Lycée Louis-le-Grand alumni
École Normale Supérieure alumni
University of Strasbourg alumni
Academic staff of the University of Strasbourg
Topologists
Algebraists